CamSoda is a live streaming webcam platform.

CamSoda, a pornography website, was started by Daron Lundeen in 2014. The video streaming platform provides for adult webcams and non-adult livestreams. CamSoda was the first to offer 360-degree virtual reality live streams. It offers products involving virtual reality touch-screen technology, interactive sex toys and products powered by Bitcoin and Ethereum.

References

External links
 

Adult camming websites
American erotica and pornography websites
Companies established in 2014